The 12 Treasures of Spain was a project that selected the purported "Twelve Treasures of the Kingdom of Spain". The contest was conducted by broadcasters Antena 3 and COPE. The final results were announced on 31 December 2007. Nine architectural monuments, two natural monuments and a monument pictorial were chosen.

Contest 
Four months after the international competition to choose the New Seven Wonders of the World, in late September 2007, Antena 3 and Onda Cero launched a campaign to elect the 12 so-called Treasures of Spain, an initiative based on the votes of the people, through internet and mobile phone. Finally, they received over 9,000 applications, and the candidates were whittled down to 20. At first they were to choose 7 Treasures of Spain, but later that figure was changed to 12.

Winners 
The twelve winners in order of votes were:

Map

Other finalists

See also 
Seven Wonders of the Ancient World
New 7 Wonders of Nature
New Seven Wonders of the World

References 
Los 12 Tesoros de España
Los 12 Tesoros de España se elegirán en Nochevieja

2007 in Spain
Cultural tourism in Spain
Spain